Juan Bautista Cejas (born 6 March 1998), is an Argentine professional footballer who plays as a winger for Uruguayan club Montevideo City.

References

1998 births
Footballers from La Plata
Living people
Argentine footballers
Argentina youth international footballers
Association football midfielders
Estudiantes de La Plata footballers
Quilmes Atlético Club footballers
Lommel S.K. players
Montevideo City Torque players
Argentine Primera División players
Challenger Pro League players
Primera Nacional players
Uruguayan Primera División players
Argentine expatriate footballers
Expatriate footballers in Belgium
Argentine expatriate sportspeople in Belgium
Expatriate footballers in Uruguay
Argentine expatriate sportspeople in Uruguay